The 2010–2011 season was Sarajevo's 62nd season in existence, and their 17th consecutive season in the top flight of Bosnian football, the Premier League of BiH. Besides competing in the Premier League, the team competed in the National Cup. The season covers the period from 25 June 2010 to 24 June 2011.

Players

Squad

(Captain)

(Captain)

Statistics

Kit

Competitions

Premier League

League table

Matches

References

FK Sarajevo seasons
Sarajevo